Candida, Cândida or Cándida is a feminine given name from Latin candidus (white). It may refer to :
 Cándida Arias (born 1992), Dominican Republic volleyball player 
 Cândida Branca Flor (1949–2001), Portuguese entertainer and traditional singer
 Candida Cave, British artist and writer
 Candida Donadio (1929-2001), American literary agent
 Candida Doyle (born 1963), Irish keyboard player with the band Pulp
 Candida Gertler (born 1966/67), British art collector
 Candida Lycett Green (born 1942), Irish-born British author
 Candida Höfer (born 1944), German photographer
 Candida Royalle, American pornographic producer-director and actress
 Candida Thompson (born 1967), English violinist
 Candida Tobin (1926–2008), author of a music education system
 Saint Candida the Elder (died 78 AD), early Christian saint from Naples
 Cándida María de Jesús (1845–1912), Spanish nun
 Maria Candida of the Eucharist (1884–1949), Roman Catholic Carmelite nun, beatified by Pope John Paul II
 Candida Xu (1607-1680), Chinese Catholic and philanthropist

References 

Latin feminine given names